Lunania elongata is a species of flowering plant in the family Salicaceae. It is mostly found in Guamuhaya Massif, Sancti Spiritus province, endemic to Cuba.  It is threatened by habitat loss.

It is an uncommon shrub or a small tree, as it is endangered due to cutting, logging, etc. It is confined to montane forest, and is rare.

References

elongata
Endemic flora of Cuba
Endangered flora of North America
Taxonomy articles created by Polbot